Beyt-e Shukaiyeh (also Romanized as Beyt-e Shūḵāīyeh) is a village in Karkheh Rural District, Hamidiyeh District, Ahvaz County, Khuzestan Province, Iran. At the 2006 census, its population was 120, in 17 families.

References 

Populated places in Ahvaz County